Through the Ashes of Empires is the fifth studio album by American heavy metal band Machine Head. The band moved away from the nu metal genre featured on their previous two albums, and towards the style of their debut Burn My Eyes and their second album The More Things Change... It was released in the UK, Europe and Australia on the Roadrunner Records International label on October 31, 2003. At this stage, Machine Head still did not have an American record deal, having parted ways with Roadrunner Records US after the Supercharger album was released. Through The Ashes of Empires was such a success that Roadrunner Records US, in an unprecedented move, quickly offered Machine Head a new contract and the album finally reached North America on April 20, 2004. This album was also the first album to feature guitarist Phil Demmel, who would stay with the band until his departure in 2018.

On December 9, 2011, the album was certified Silver by the British Phonographic Industry and it has sold just under 80,000 copies in the UK.

Background
Because guitarist Ahrue Luster had left the band due to creative differences, the album was written by the remaining three band members, with then-temporary guitarist Phil Demmel only joining in for the recording sessions. When asked about the writing process for the album, vocalist and guitarist Robb Flynn said:
"...when Ahrue quit MH to go join Nickelback wannabes Juggernaut, we made a decision to start writing as a three-piece. We didn't want to go through the whole 'try out' process, and see if some new guy would fit."

A special edition of the album was also released, containing a second disc with early demo recordings of songs from TTAOE as well as a short video of Machine Head in the studio during the recording of the album. The band discusses the gear used to record the album as well as various issues relating to it.

The band recorded an additional song, "Seasons Wither", for the North American release of the album as a measure of compensation for the American fans for having to wait so long; it was subsequently released internationally as a B-side on the "Days Turn Blue to Gray" single. According to guitarist Demmel, the song also gives an indication of the direction the band would take with their next album, The Blackening.

In 2013, Robb Flynn released a demo for the unused track "Pins and Needles", which the band rejected for being "one of the worst songs [Flynn has] ever written when it comes to [his] vocals and vocal ideas". Despite the group's negativity towards the demo, it would later be rewritten to become the Roadrunner United track "Army of the Sun" with Tim Williams from Vision of Disorder on vocals.

The album can be considered an encapsulation of the band at that point, stylistically concompassing all four of their previous works. It has the melodicism of The Burning Red and Supercharger, the darker, heavier groove of The More Things Change and the sheer aggression of Burn My Eyes. Lyrically, the album is rooted in stories of personal struggles, triumphs, morbidity, and abuse.

The album has since proven to be a success with critics, music charts and fans. The album has been well-embraced as an excellent return to form both musically and lyrically. The difficult circumstances under which the album was recorded was documented on their concert DVD Elegies.

Critical reception
The album received positive reviews and was a commercial success, In 2005, Through the Ashes of Empires was ranked number 311 in Rock Hard magazine's book of The 500 Greatest Rock & Metal Albums of All Time.

Track listing

"Seasons Wither" did not appear on the original worldwide release, but was added to the US release to make up for the delayed release; in this edition, the song appears between "Vim" and "All Falls Down".

Personnel
Robb Flynn – lead vocals, rhythm guitar, guitar solo on "Left Unfinished", second guitar solo on "Vim"
Adam Duce – bass, backing vocals
Phil Demmel – lead guitar
Dave McClain – drums

Charts

Certifications

References

Machine Head (band) albums
2003 albums
Roadrunner Records albums